Jason Yachanin is an American actor most known for playing Arbie in the comedy horror film Poultrygeist: Night of the Chicken Dead. He also appeared in the film Friends (With Benefits) and a segment of the film V/H/S.

Filmography
 2006: Poultrygeist: Night of the Chicken Dead - Arbie
 2007: Kid Fitness (TV Series)
 2008: Friends (With Benefits)
 2010: Short Sighted (TV Series)
 2012: V/H/S (Segment: "Tuesday the 17th") - "Spider"
 2012: Supernaturalz: Weird, Creepy & Random
 2012: Gerald (Short Film)
 2015: Blue Bloods (TV Series) Season 5, Episode 20: "Payback" - "Sound Tech Guy"

References

External links
 

Year of birth missing (living people)
Living people
American male actors
People from Brunswick, Ohio